Kulti Assembly constituency is an assembly constituency in Paschim Bardhaman district in the Indian state of West Bengal.

Overview
As per orders of the Delimitation Commission,  No. 282 Kulti assembly constituency covers Wards nos. 16-19, 58-74, 99-105 of Asansol Municipal Corporation.

Kulti assembly segment is part of No. 40 Asansol (Lok Sabha constituency).

Members of Legislative Assembly

Election results

2021

 

*The Congress party had an alliance with CPI(M)

2016

2011
In the 2011 election, Ujjal Chatterjee of Trinamool Congress defeated his nearest rival Maniklal Acharya of AIFB.

.# Swing calculated on Congress+Trinamool Congress vote percentages in 2006 taken together.

1977-2006
Ujjal Chatterjee of Trinamool Congress won the Kulti assembly seat in 2006. Maniklal Acharya of Forward Bloc won the seat in 2001. Prior to that the seat was won by Maniklal Acharjee of Forward Bloc in 1996 and 1991, Tuhin Samanta of Congress in 1987, Madhu Banerjee of Forward Bloc in 1982 and 1977.

1951-1977
Ramdas Banerjee of Congress won in 1972 and 1971, Dr. Taraknath Chakrabarti of Samyukta Socialist Party won in 1969, Dr. Jai Narayan Sharma of Congress in 1967 and 1962, Benarasi Prasad Jha of PSP in 1957. In 1952, independent India's first election, Kulti was a twin member constituency and those elected were Jai Narayan Sharma and Baidyanath Mondal, both of Congress.

References

Politics of Paschim Bardhaman district
Assembly constituencies of West Bengal